, also written as Blade Dance of Elementalers, is a Japanese light novel series written by Yū Shimizu with illustrations by Hanpen Sakura (volumes 1-13), Yuuji Nimura (volumes 14-16) and Kohada Shimesada (volumes 17-20). A manga adaptation illustrated by Hyōju Issei was serialized from June 27, 2012 to January 27, 2017 in Media Factory's Monthly Comic Alive and compiled in six volumes. The first volume was released on February 23, 2013. An anime television series adaptation by TNK aired from July 14 to September 29, 2014. The last volume of the novel was released on March 25, 2019.

Plot
The story takes place in a world where spirits exist and only pure maidens have the privilege of contracting with the spirits. These maidens hail from noble families and gather at the Areishia Spirit Academy, a specialized school where they are trained to become elementalists.

However, a male teenager named Kamito Kazehaya changes everything. After receiving an invitation from the Academy's director, Greyworth Ciel Mais to come to Areisha Spirit Academy, he loses his way in the spirit forest and stumbles upon a girl named Claire Rouge purifying herself in a lake. She is, understandably, upset and embarrassed and attacks him. He is able to avoid the worst of her wrath and finds out that she intends to contract with a sealed sword spirit. He accompanies her so that she can guide him out of the forest once she has accomplished her goal. Claire attempts to contract with the sealed sword spirit but fails causing it to go berserk. In order to save her life and much to Claire's chagrin, Kamito forms a contract with the sword spirit himself, turning him into the only male elementalist in the world (he also becomes the second male elementalist in 1000 years). Disregarding the fact that he saved her life, she accuses him of stealing her spirit and insists that he atone for it by becoming her contracted spirit.

Characters

Team Scarlet

The world's only known male elementalist. He forms an incomplete contract with the sealed sword spirit, Est, while responding to a summon from the director of Areishia Spirit Academy.

Before being summoned to the Academy he was raised as an elite assassin by the Institutional School where he was conditioned to become an emotionless shell in order to make him a more controllable (and disposable) tool. However, his life changed after meeting the spirit, Restia. She taught him about the world outside of the school, and, in the process, rekindled his emotions. The Institutional School was attacked and destroyed by a rampant fire spirit which allowed him to escape, along with the sealed artifact, a special ring that belonged to the first "Demon King", imprisoning Restia. An encounter with Greyworth, further changed his life.

Three years before, Kamito participated in the Blade Dance in drag under the name Ren Ashbell and won the title of the Strongest Blade Dancer. He had long hair at the time, and an outfit (for girls) from what is believed to be his homeland as his disguise. Since Ren Ashbell is such a prominent role model to many of the maidens at the Academy, Kamito tries to avoid using his better-known techniques to avoid revealing that everyone's favorite idol is really a boy, usually unsuccessfully. His attempts at subterfuge are aided by the fact that, as Ren, he wielded Restia (a black sword) with his left hand (now covered with a glove), and he now wields Est (a white sword) with his right hand.

Kamito's life at the Academy is rather taxing because of The girls' feelings for him, coupled with wildly exaggerated rumors and misconceptions about him. The result of these hijinks is that Kamito becomes known as the 'Demon King of the Night' (and eventually daylight and noon). The irony of the situation is that if Kamito had actually done even a fraction of the perverted stuff he is rumored to, neither he or the girls he 'soiled' would be pure enough to use their contracted Spirits. Despite this inconsistency, the rumors about him are considered fact by numerous Intelligence agencies including the Duchy of Dracunia who first wanted to castrate him to protect innocent maidens, and then later changed their minds to wanting to seduce him, with the hope that the resulting children would inherit his abilities.

Claire is the younger daughter of Duke Elstein. She inherited the Elstein fire-red hair and eyes as well as the family aptitude for Fire magic. The Elsteins were grand nobles who had served the royal family for generations ever since the founding of the Ordesian Empire. Four years ago her elder sister, Rubia, the Queen serving under the Fire Elemental Lord, snatched the strongest flame spirit, Laevateinn, and disappeared. Outraged by this betrayal, the Fire Elemental Lord burned parts of the Empire and would not allow any fires other than those of Flame Spirits to exist within the Empire. Ren Ashbell's Blade Dance the following year appeased the Fire Lord's anger enough that he stopped randomly burning the Empire. As the result of that incident, the Elstein duchy and fortune were seized and the duke and his wife were imprisoned in Balsas's prison. Although Claire was not sent to prison, the Imperial family demanded the return of Scarlet, her elemental spirit. However, Greyworth interceded on her behalf, saying that Claire would become an excellent elementalist at her Academy.

After Claire accepted Greyworth's offer, she dropped the Elstein family name and attends Areishia Spirit Academy under the alias Claire Rouge. Initially a meek and shy child Claire has strengthened herself in order to win the Blade Dance and find out the reasons for her sister's actions. Due to being ostracized as the sister of the "Calamity Queen", she has little trust in anybody other than Scarlet. Claire has studied intensely to become one of the top students of the school and become an able strategist. Her contract symbol with Scarlet is on the back of her right hand and looks like a white/red whirling mass of flames.

Although she treats Kamito as her 'slave spirit' as punishment for contracting Est in her place, she seems to enjoy books where the male character enslaves the female protagonist and even has dreams of being Kamito's slave. Like many other maidens, she was inspired by Ren Ashbell's Blade Dance three years ago. She has suspicions of Kamito being Ren Ashbell after observing him fight using the same moves as Ren and seeing him cross-dress during the current Blade Dance.

A daughter of Duke Fahrengart who's the head of the militant Fahrengart family. She has contracted with Simurgh, a wind spirit who appears as a large hawk with a waffe form of a spear. Her contract symbol is on the back of her right hand and resembles the view of a tornado seen from directly above in white/green. The Duke Fahrengart is Ellis' father, who wants her to marry Kamito and raise kids. Ellis also has a two years-elder adopted sister, Velsaria Eva Fahrengart.

Ellis is also the captain of the Sylphid Knights; a group of students, who help protect the Academy, enforce discipline and morals, handle wild spirits and the recently opened Astral Gates in the forest. Although initially vehemently against Kamito's presence at the Academy (as the only other known male elementalist was the demon king) she gradually warms up to and falls in love with him. Ellis has a strict and firm personality, but has the heart of an innocent maiden which her close friends and comrades in the Sylphid Knights take advantage of;– she was once tricked her into believing a risqué outfit was the new dress uniform. It's unknown if she had a specific wish for the Blade Dance, although she may have entered to save her sister Velsaria as well as to bring honor to her family and country.

After seeing Kamito fight numerous times she is suspicious of how similar his fighting style is to Ren Ashbell's, but is fooled by an article listing Ashbell's believed "preferences" which are different from his due to him giving vague yes/no answers back then to cover his voice cracking. In Volume 13, she gets a big boost to her divine power and recovery ability after kissing Kamito on the lips. The boost was powerful enough to heal several days' worth of injuries in one day and enlarged Sigmurgh enough to enable him to carry two people instead of just one.

She is one of the daughters of the Laurenfrost family. While a prominent family it was slightly lesser to that of the Elsteins before their fall. Rinsletl's personality is that of a showoff that enjoys the spotlight chance permitting, but not at the expense of doing her duty. Despite that is still a shy girl who hides her concern for others and unlike many never treated Claire any differently from when they were friends to Rubia becoming the Calamity Queen. She was chosen by the Laurenfrost guardian spirit Fenrir to be his contractor. Due to being contracted with him she is very skilled in Ice magic and an accomplished sniper with his Waffe form of a bow. Like the others has the heart of an innocent maiden who falls deeply for Kamito. Also like the others this does not stop her from striking hard with magic (and holding him completely at fault) if she catches him in an embarrassing situation with another girl. She is an expert in domestic matter due to her maid Carol being completely lacking in skills of being a Laurenfrost maid except for being cute (and able to trick Rinslet easily).

Rinslet enters the Blade Dance with the wish for the Water Lord to forgive her sister Judia and break the eternal ice curse cast upon her for what was thought to be a mistake during a kagura dance to the Water Lord. Similar to Ellis she gets a boost to her divine power after kissing Kamito in Volume 13. Position in team is that of Sniper/Support as her Ice Magic and Bow attacks are best suited for mid/long range battle while extremely disadvantageous at close melee range. Contract symbol is on back of her right hand and resembles a white/blue complex snowflake with two sides cropped off by the edge of the symbol. While trying to save a spirit after the Blade Dance she gets another contract symbol on the back of her left hand that looks like a white/blue ice rose.

She is the second princess of the Ordesian Empire and the chosen contractor of the family guardian spirit, Georgios. Her contract symbol is white/gold in color and located just above her cleavage. It is discovered later that she was using pads and the family bloodstone she stole to appear bigger. Fianna has a playful personality with a risque sense of humour that earned her the nickname Perverted Princess. She is aware that Kamito is Ren Ashbell due to him having saved her from a rogue spirit while wielding Restia three years previously. She demanded his true name and made a promise to meet him again. When she enrolls in the Academy, Greyworth asks Kamito's team to act as Fianna's bodyguard and Kamito does not recognize her at first due to trauma and Restia's magic clouding his memories around the time of his wish.

Fianna was raised as a typical potential Queen candidate maiden being trained in seclusion but she has been unable to summon Georgios since Rubia used the just stolen Levateinn to take out Georgios in one strike. As a result she was ostracized as the "Lost Queen", practically disowned, and treated harshly by not only her family, but the family servants and other nobles as well. Especially in regards to her two year-older brother, Arneus Ray Ordesia, who she considers cruel and unfit to be the next emperor as well as anyone getting what they deserve if they crown him. As with many other girls of her generation, seeing Ren Ashbell's Blade Dance three years ago gave her the strength to go on. Greyworth and a few other teachers are aware that she 'cheated' on her entrance exam by using flash stones (magic stones containing a spirit anyone can use but is expensive and one use only) and that she is unable to function as an elementalist, but the headmistress allowed her to enroll regardless, hoping that she will be able to regain her abilities.

Fianna joins Team Scarlet, and with the support of Kamito and the others, is able to summon Georgios again. Her purpose in entering the Blade Dance is to regain her ability as an elementalist. Due to lack of combat training, she is unable to enter direct combat except for summoning and sending Georgios. After learning how to summon a waffe she is also able to cast the spell known as "Save the Queen" which establishes an area around where the waffe has been stabbed into the ground as her territory which shields those inside from enemy attacks as well as heal wounds and replenish divine power through the Holy Attribute. She acts as the team's healer but she has to be in skin contact with Kamito to heal him due to his resistance to Holy magic, which she does quite willingly and forwardly. While she cherishes the friends who did not abandon her, she wishes to remain with Team Scarlet as they fully accepted her, even after discovering she was initially faking being an elementalist (especially as she is very much in love with Kamito.)

Spirits

Est is Kamito's second contracted spirit. Due to his guilt (for making another spirit contract) and refusal to abandon Restia, the contract was only partially completed so she can only manifest 10% of her power. Therefore, unlike other spirits, she can't return to Astral Zero to recharge and so spends a large amount of time sleeping in sword form to recover her strength. This also means Kamito can't summon her with the Spirit Seal on his hand as summoning only works if the spirit is in Astral Zero. She has long, white hair, blue eyes, and in human form looks to be about 12-13 years old. She is usually stoic (speaking softly in a monotone), but she likes to be praised and having Kamito pat her on the head. Est is especially jealous of Restia. In an effort to "please" Kamito she has read some of Claire's X-rated books and wears unusual costumes from Fianna's collection to bid him good morning. For some reason Est has no problem appearing naked as long as her legs are covered, usually with knee socks.

In the past, she was contracted to Areishia Idriss, the Sacred Queen who defeated the Demon King, but her unique ability which destroys curses unfortunately builds up her own curse until it activates turning her wielder into Spirit Crystal. This is because she is not a true Holy Sword but rather a Demonic Sword. After years of daily fighting, her curse finally took its toll and, to her horror, Est witnessed Areishia turn into crystal right in front of her. Afterwards that she sealed herself in the Demon King's armory and refused to make a contract with anyone to prevent the same thing from happening again. After her memory was restored, not wanting to curse Kamito too, she sealed herself away again but he refused saying that he would accept her curse and destiny even if it would one day lead to his own destruction.

Kamito's first contracted spirit. She was sealed in the ring of Sulaimon and taught Kamito everything including about the world beyond the Institutional School, and giving him emotions as well as forming a Spirit Contract with him without permission. After the Institutional School was destroyed Kamito took the ring and searched for a way to release her, eventually leading him to Greyworth who took an interest in him and helped him to release her from the ring. Afterwards she and Kamito took part in the Bladedance becoming the Strongest Bladedancer and making a forbidden wish which corrupted her and made her disappear. It's later revealed that she was one of the 72 pillars of the first Demon King and that her job is to find, select, and raise a potential candidate as the next Demon King if she feels that person is worthy of inheriting the title. Kamito is the first potential candidate she has come into contact with who was not overwhelmed by the Demon King's power within them. Her personality is that of a mischievous, caring young woman fond of pranks but can be deadly serious when the situation calls for it. Like Est she cares very deeply for Kamito and is jealous that Est is also Kamito's contracted spirit. Restia's contract circle isn't described but is located on Kamito's left hand which he usually covers with a leather glove. As no two Spirit Contract symbols are alike this could expose his identity as Ren Ashbell whose Spirit Contract symbol is as well known as Ashbell is.

Her elemental waffe is The Sword That Pierces Truth Vorpal Sword that looks like a black greatsword with a red edge. Her special power as a sword is releasing powerful black/purple lightning that destroys almost everything it touches. In human form she can disappear into shadows and shoot all the feathers from her wings like darts, although using the latter prevents her from being able to fly until her wings recover. To ensure that she doesn't become the "Enemy of the World" she told Kamito to kill her if she became someone other than herself.

Scarlet is Claire's female contracted spirit that had been passed down the Elstein family contracting only with those of her choosing. Scarlet usually takes the form of a flaming red house cat or, when in waffe form, that of a whip with Fire attributes. It is later revealed that Scarlet is in fact a powerful fire spirit able to take human form, but that her true name, Ortlinde, was forgotten. Ortlinde, also known as the Scarlet Valkyrie, appears as a young cat girl garbed in flames who wields a flame scythe and is able to conjure fireballs which are immensely more powerful than Claire's. Due to her isolation as Rubia's younger sister, Claire developed a habit of keeping Scarlet around for companionship. Scarlet is fond of Kamito because he feeds her and Ortlinde considers him to be Claire's master because of Claire's dreams involving him.

Fenrir is an Ice attribute spirit, contracted with Rinslet Laurenfrost, who takes the form of a white/silver Wolf with blue eyes. Fenrir is large enough to be ridden by Rinslet. His waffe form is that of a silvery bow that shoots ice arrows. In addition to Ice Magic, Fenrir can also 'suck' up items that are carried in some kind of pocket dimension (Hammerspace) that can be 'spat' out later depending on which items are wanted.

Simurgh is Ellis' contracted Wind spirit who takes the form of a large hawk or, in his waffe form, that of a spear. Being a Wind spirit, Simorgh is able to act independently at greater distances than other contracted spirits.

Georgios is Fianna's contracted Holy Spirit who takes the form of a glowing knight in full plate armor wielding a sword and shield. Georgios' waffe form is that of a ceremonial rapier. As a Holy Spirit he has extreme resistance and can inflict severe damage to Darkness Spirits. Georgios was overwhelmed by Rubia when Fianna tried to stop Rubia's betrayal, and as a result Fianna became unable to summon him until, three years later, she was able to regain the inner strength she needed thanks to Kamito. Unlike Claire and Rinslet, Fianna doesn't summon Georgios for companionship but only when he is needed.

Ordesian Empire

Areishia Spirit Academy

Greyworth is the principal and director of the Areishia Spirit Academy and a former member of the Ordesia Empire's Numbers, an organization of elites. She is also known as the "Dusk Witch". She has the appearance of a beautiful woman in her early twenties with ash-blonde hair and gray eyes. She won the Blade Dance 24 years prior to the beginning of the story with her demon spirit, Void. She wished for immortality and youth. She met Kamito soon after he escaped the destruction of the Instructional School when he was contracted to kill her. She took him in and trained him in the sword techniques that allowed him to win the Blade Dance the following year. In the present, she summons Kamito to Areishia Spirit Academy where she enrolls him as a transfer and forces him to participate in the current Blade Dance.

Freya is a teacher at Areishia Spirit Academy. She is Raven Class's homeroom lecturer and a shadow spirit elementalist. She is also the manager of the academy's Astral Gate. She appears to be in her mid-twenties and has long black hair. She uses her ability to travel between shadows to gather information for Greyworth. As a member of the Spirit Research Agency Freya has traveled and performed field work across the continent.

Instructional School
The Instructional School was a secret academy run by powerful but unknown people from the Empire for the express purpose of training children to become emotionless assassins. The children raised at the Instructional School were usually orphans, abandoned for various reasons or kidnapped. The school was destroyed by an extremely powerful fire spirit and those children who were not killed or did not escape on their own were taken into the care of the Ordesian Empire.

Muir was the second most powerful assassin at the Instructional School after Kamito. She was born in a small village on the border of the Empire. Even though she was not of noble blood, she was found to possess the ability to contract with spirits and for this she was treasured. On her fourth birthday she was presented to the village's guardian spirit in hopes that she would form a contract with it and so allow the village to prosper. Unknown to the villagers, Muir's ability could only cause spirits she encountered to go berserk. As a result, the guardian spirit ran amok and destroyed the village and itself in the process. Vilified, Muir was abandoned and picked up by the Instructional School, where she was taught nothing but slaughter techniques, given the Cursed Armament Seal called "Jester's Vice", which allowed her some measure of control over the spirits she encountered, and became known as a Monster. She has a child-like personality and likes to do things as the whim takes her without regards for anyone else. Since she was born with a power which the world rejects, she has chosen to reject the world in turn and is merciless against those who oppose her will, with the exception of Kamito, whom she refers to as Onii-sama. In fact, one might call Muir obsessed with Kamito who tried to befriend her when she arrived at the Instructional School, but when she refused friendship offered to think of her as a younger sister.

Lily is an Elfim assassin with jade-green hair, red eyes and pointy ears. She was ranked as the sixth strongest at Instructional School and worked closely with Muir and Kamito, where she was in charge of information gathering. Lily has contracted with Titania, a plant spirit with many different types of poisons and chemicals to wear down its opponents that have been touched by its spines. :Following the destruction of the Instructional School, Lily was found by Rubia Elstein and swore loyalty to her because not only did Rubia value her abilities, but she treated Lily as a person worthy of respect rather than a disposable tool. Two years later, she was reunited with Muir and later became a member of Team Inferno.

Jio was an orphan who was raised at the Instructional School. He has a hard, steel-like reddish hair (black in the light novel) and red eyes with dark skin. Although he went through the same training as Kamito, his abilities were inferior (he was outclassed by both Muir and Kamito) and he did not have the ability to communicate and form a contract with spirits. Jio has a haughty and arrogant personality that considers spirits to be disposable tools to be used up and discarded like trash. Only keeps his promises or word when he feels like it, and ready to break them and abandon anyone at his earliest convenience while saying it's not his fault that they were foolish enough to trust him.

After the destruction of the Instructional School, Jio was found to have the ability to maintain numerous Spirit Seals within his body (in the form of tattoos) and command them through use of a blood stone. (Most people would have trouble with just a few Seals without getting drained.) He is extremely jealous of Kamito's position as the next demon king and tries to defeat Kamito using various tricks to make it seem that he's doing so with the Demon King's power to prove 'he' is the rightful successor and not the cheap imitation he really is. After his defeat, Jio is sent to Balsas Prison.

Laurenfrost House

She is the second daughter of Gryus Laurenfrost. Rinslet's younger sister. She took Rinslet's place to do a dance honoring the Water Elemental Lord Iseria Seaward, but made a mistake resulting her being imprisoned in eternal ice for punishment. No Water Spirit users have been able to melt the ice, and no offerings have been enough to pardon Judia. Feeling guilty for letting Judia take her place in the dance, Rinslet wants to win the Blade Dance to wish Judia forgiven and freed.

Turns out Judia didn't make a mistake, but during her dance the Darkness driving the Elemental Lords mad noticed her and used the ritual to send a piece of itself into her to control her. Unable to stop it from corrupting Judia, Iseria froze her to stop keep her from summoning the rest of the Darkness into the human world. However, Kamito is able to use Est to free Judia from the Darkness, but what damage to her body and mind is unknown as she's still out cold at the end of Light Novel 13 and is resting in bed.

Rinslet's youngest sister. Looks a lot like a younger Rinslet, but hasn't shown any signs of forming a Spirit Contract yet.

She is Rinslet Laurenfrost's personal maid. Although Carol is quite useless as a maid, she understands her master very well and she is always there to support Rinslet. Carol often relays her master's true feelings to Kamito when Rinslet is not being honest. She is adept at talking Rinslet into taking care of her and doing things she should be doing for Rinslet. While she hasn't shown any skills expected for a maid, she seems to be accepted as a Laurenfrost maid as their only criterion seems to be that a maid is cute.

Media

Light novels

Bladedance of Elementalers is a light novel series written by Yū Shimizu with illustrations by Hanpen Sakura (volumes 1-14), Yuuji Nimura (14-16) and Kohada Shimesada (17-20). The first volume was published on December 24, 2010 under Media Factory's MF Bunko J. Twenty novels in the series and one extra have been released.

Manga
A manga adaptation illustrated by Hyōju Issei was serialized from June 27, 2012 to January 27, 2017 in Media Factory's Monthly Comic Alive and compiled in six volumes. The first volume was released on February 23, 2013 and the last on March 23, 2017. In May 2014, Digital Manga licensed the manga for release in North America, and released the first volume on October 27, 2015. They did not release others.

Anime
It was one of five MF Bunko J light novel anime adaptations announced at Media Factory's Summer School Festival event on July 28, 2013. An anime television series adaptation by TNK aired from July 14 to September 29, 2014. The opening theme is  performed by Hitomi Harada and the ending theme song is  performed by Knee-Socks. Each BD release included a short special episode. Crunchyroll streamed the series, while Sentai Filmworks have licensed the series.

References

External links
Official light novel website 
Official anime website 

2010 Japanese novels
2012 manga
2014 anime television series debuts
Anime and manga based on light novels
Digital Manga Publishing titles
Fantasy anime and manga
Harem anime and manga
Japanese fantasy novels
Light novels
Media Factory manga
MF Bunko J
Kadokawa Dwango franchises
Seinen manga
Sentai Filmworks
TNK (company)